Suja Irfan is a cricketer from Bangladesh. He is a left-handed batsman and slow left arm orthodox spin bowler. He played for Chittagong Division from 2000/01 to 2002/03 taking a five wicket haul 5 for 69 against Dhaka Division.

He was born on 4 August 1978 in Chittagong and is a left-handed batsman and slow left arm orthodox spin bowler.

He played for Chittagong Division from 2000/01 to 2002/03, taking a five wicket haul, 5 for 69, against Dhaka Division.

References

External links
 

Bangladeshi cricketers
Chittagong Division cricketers
Living people
1978 births